The study of Higher Education Leadership encompasses primarily the academic disciplines of leadership and organizational theory.

Founded in 1976, the Association for the Study of Higher Education (ASHE) is a national organization of scholars dedicated to higher education as a field of study. Relevant journals include the American Educational Research Journal and Studies in Higher Education and Research in Higher Education.

Many colleges and universities offer Ph.D. and Ed.D. programs in higher education administration and leadership, including Eastern Michigan University.

Higher education